Associazione Sportiva Dilettantistica Tiger Brolo was an Italian association football club, based in Brolo, Sicily.

It last played in Serie D in 2015.

History

Foundation 
The club was founded in 2003.

Serie D 
In the season 2013–14 the team was promoted for the first time, from Eccellenza Sicily/B to Serie D. After just season, they were relegated back to Eccellenza; however, in July 2015, the club failed to register to the new season due to financial issues and therefore folded altogether.

References

External links 
 Official homepage

Football clubs in Italy
Football clubs in Sicily
Association football clubs established in 2003
Association football clubs disestablished in 2015
2003 establishments in Italy
2015 disestablishments in Italy